Karel Bernard Boedijn (29 June 1893 – 29 August 1964) was a Dutch botanist and mycologist. Born in Amsterdam, he graduated with a PhD from the University of Amsterdam in 1925; his thesis was titled "Der Zusammenhang zwischen den Chromosomen und Mutationen bei Oenothera lamarckiana" (The relationship between chromosomes and mutations in Oenothera lamarckiana).

Selected publications
Boedijn KB, Steinmann A. (1931). "Les espèces des genres Helicobasidium et Septobasidium des Indes Néerlandaises" (The species in the genera Helicobasidium and Septobasidium in Java, Bali, and Malaysia). Bulletin du Jardin Botanique de Buitzenzorg 3rd series, 11:2 pp. 165–219.
Boedijn KB. (1932). "The genus Sarcosoma in Netherlands India". Annales du Jardin Botanique de Buitenzorg 3rd series, 12:2 pp. 273–279.
Boedijn KB. (1932). "The Phallineae of the Netherlands East Indies". Annales du Jardin Botanique de Buitenzorg 3rd series, 12 pp. 71–103.
Boedijn KB. (1933). "The genera Phillipsia and Cookeina in Netherlands India". Annales du Jardin Botanique de Buitenzorg 3rd series, 13:1 pp. 57–76.
Boedijn KB. (1951). "Notes on Indonesian fungi. The genus Amanita". Sydowia 5: 317–327.
Boedijn KB. (1961). "Myriangiales from Indonesia". Persoonia 2 (1): 63–75.
Boedijn KB. (1962). "The Sordariaceae of Indonesia". Persoonia 2 (3): 305–320.

Eponymous taxa
Many species as well as narrower and broader taxonomical units have been named for Boedijn.
Boedijnopeziza S.Ito & S.Imai (1937)
Asterina boedijniana Hansf. (1954)
Ceramothyrium boedijnii Bat., Nascim. & Cif. (1962)
Chaetothyrium boedijnii Hansf. (1957)
Cordierites boedijnii W.Y.Zhuang (1988)
Gastroboletus boedijnii Lohwag (1926)
Inocybe trechispora var. boedijnii Singer (1936)
Lembosia boedijnii Hansf. (1945)
Meliola boedijniana Hansf. (1954)
Meliola boedijnii Cif. (1951)
Midotis boedijnii Cif. (1957)
Pseudocercospora boedijniana U.Braun (2001)
Septobasidium boedijnii Couch ex L.D.Gómez & Henk (2004)

See also
 :Category:Taxa named by Karel Bernard Boedijn

Further reading

References

1893 births
1964 deaths
20th-century Dutch botanists
Dutch mycologists
University of Amsterdam alumni
Scientists from Amsterdam